Narf or NARF may refer to:
 Narf, a fictional creature; A sea nymph in the film Lady in the Water
 Native American Rights Fund, an American law firm
 Nuclear prelamin A recognition factor
 Narf (singer), the stage name of Galician singer Francisco Xavier Pérez Vázquez
 Narf, a character on Sesame Street; see List of Sesame Street Muppets
 Narf!, an interjection used by the cartoon character Pinky of Pinky and the Brain